Cape Daly is an ice-covered promontory on the coast of Antarctica,  west of Safety Island and close southeast of the Robinson Group. It was discovered in February 1931 by the British Australian New Zealand Antarctic Research Expedition under Mawson, who named it for Senator Daly of the Australian Senate.

References 

Headlands of Mac. Robertson Land